Royal Air Force Silloth or RAF Silloth is a former Royal Air Force station  north-east of Silloth, Cumbria, England, and  south-west of Kirkbride, Cumbria. The station was used by RAF Coastal Command.

The airfield is also known as Silloth Airfield/Aerodrome.

Station history

The airfield was originally designed to be used by RAF Maintenance Command but was handed over to Coastal Command in November 1939. It had a satellite at RAF Hornby Hall.

Based units
 No. 1 (Coastal) Operational Training Unit RAF (OTU) using Avro Ansons, Bristol Beauforts and Bothas.
 No. 6 Operational Training Unit RAF with the Vickers Wellington and Anson.
 No. 215 Squadron RAF using the Wellington.
 No. 320 (Netherlands) Squadron RAF using the Avro Anson I.
 No. 22 Maintenance Unit RAF.
 No. 1353 (Target Towing) Flight RAF using the Supermarine Spitfire and the Vultee A-31 Vengeance.
 No. 5 Ferry Pool RAF.

Current use
Many of the buildings still survive, including the hangars, but the runways are in a bad condition.

A farmers' market and Seacote Caravan Park occupy the outer edge of the airport. A number of private homes are found on the north-west side of the former airfield. Enkev, a natural fibre company, has its UK office at the airfield.

See also
 List of former Royal Air Force stations

References

Citations

Bibliography

External links

Royal Air Force stations in Cumbria
History of Cumbria